Mabashi (馬橋) may refer to:

Mabashi Station, a train station in Matsudo, Chiba
Mabashi (Bleach), a character in the Bleach anime series